Hill House, or variations such as Hill Cottage and Hill Farm, may refer to:

in Scotland
 Hill House, Helensburgh, Scotland, a house designed by architect Charles Rennie Mackintosh

in the United States 
Hugh Wilson Hill House, Carrollton, Alabama, listed on the National Register of Historic Places (NRHP)
Hill House (Prescott, Arizona), listed on the NRHP in Yavapai County, Arizona
Hill Farm (Beebe, Arkansas), NRHP-listed
Hill–Carrillo Adobe, Santa Barbara, California, NRHP-listed
Hill–Stead Museum, Farmington, Connecticut, a house that is a National Historic Landmark and NRHP-listed
Robert Hill House, Kenton, Delaware, NRHP-listed
Dr. George E. Hill House, Merritt Island, Florida, NRHP-listed
A. P. Hill House, Clarkesville, Georgia, listed on the NRHP in Habersham County, Georgia
Hiram Warner Hill House, Greenville, Georgia, listed on the NRHP in Meriwether County, Georgia
Burwell O. Hill House, Greenville, Georgia, listed on the NRHP in Meriwether County, Georgia
Hill–Kurtz House, Griffin, Georgia, NRHP-listed
Hill Hall at Savannah State College, Savannah, Georgia, NRHP-listed
W.H. Hill House, Hilo, Hawaii, listed on the NRHP in Hawaii County, Hawaii
Matt N. Hill Homestead Barn, McCall, Idaho, listed on the NRHP in Valley County, Idaho
Clara Hill House, Meridian, Idaho, listed on the NRHP in Ada County, Idaho
Hayward–Hill House, Hillsboro, Illinois, NRHP-listed
William Hill Polygonal Barn, Bloomingdale, Indiana, NRHP-listed
John Fitch Hill House, Indianapolis, Indiana, NRHP-listed
Samuel E. Hill House, Hartford, Kentucky, listed on the NRHP in Ohio County, Kentucky
Dr. Oliver Perry Hill House, Lancaster, Kentucky, listed on the NRHP in Garrard County, Kentucky
The Hill (Arcadia, Louisiana), listed on the NRHP in Bienville Parish, Louisiana
Gov. John F. Hill Mansion, Augusta, Maine, NRHP-listed
McCobb–Hill–Minott House, Phippsburg, Maine, NRHP-listed
 Hill House (Parkton, Maryland), NRHP-listed
Addison Hill House, Arlington, Massachusetts, NRHP-listed
Abraham Hill House, Belmont, Massachusetts, NRHP-listed
Deacon Samuel Hill House, Billerica, Massachusetts, NRHP-listed
Aaron Hill House, Cambridge, Massachusetts, NRHP-listed
Moore–Hill House, Peabody, Massachusetts, NRHP-listed
Sidney A. Hill House, Stoneham, Massachusetts, NRHP-listed
Rev. Thomas Hill House, Waltham, Massachusetts, NRHP-listed
James J. Hill House, St. Paul, Minnesota, a National Historic Landmark and NRHP-listed
Matt and Emma Hill Historic Farmstead, Tower, Minnesota, listed on the NRHP in St. Louis County, Minnesota
Redding–Hill House, Keytesville, Missouri, NRHP-listed
Hill–Lassonde House, Manchester, New Hampshire, NRHP-listed
Slaughter–Hill Ranch, Roswell, New Mexico, NRHP-listed (see also Slaughter-Hill House in Virginia)
Nathaniel Hill Brick House, Montgomery, New York, NRHP-listed
Hill Cottage (Saranac Lake, New York), NRHP-listed
John Sprunt Hill House, Durham, North Carolina, NRHP-listed
Buckner Hill House, Faison, North Carolina, NRHP-listed
J. S. Hill House, Winston-Salem, North Carolina, NRHP-listed
James Hill House, Cleveland, Ohio, listed on the NRHP in Cleveland, Ohio
James Delos Hill House, Montpelier, Ohio, listed on the NRHP in Williams County, Ohio
Martin and Carrie Hill House, Hood River, Oregon, NRHP-listed
Hill House (Boalsburg, Pennsylvania), NRHP-listed
John Hill House, Erie, Pennsylvania, NRHP-listed
Hill–Physick House, Philadelphia, Pennsylvania, NRHP-listed
Alexander–Hill House, Seneca, South Carolina, NRHP-listed
John Hill–Keltomaki Ranch, Brownsville, South Dakota, NRHP-listed
Hill–Hance House, Chestnut Hill, Tennessee, NRHP-listed
Abraham Wiley Hill House, Hills Prairie, Texas, listed on the NRHP in Bastrop County, Texas
Kirby–Hill House, Kountze, Texas, listed on the NRHP in Hardin County, Texas
Ben Hill House, McKinney, Texas, listed on the NRHP in Collin County, Texas
Davis–Hill House, McKinney, Texas, listed on the NRHP in Collin County, Texas
W. R. Hill House, McKinney, Texas, listed on the NRHP in Collin County, Texas 
John B. Hill House, McKinney, Texas, listed on the NRHP in Collin County, Texas
Moran Hill House, McKinney, Texas, listed on the NRHP in Collin County, Texas
Hill–Howard House, Victoria, Texas, listed on the NRHP in Collin County, Texas
Ira Hill House, Isle La Motte, Vermont, NRHP-listed
Captain Timothy Hill House, Chincoteague Island, Virginia, NRHP-listed
A. P. Hill Boyhood Home, Culpeper, Virginia, [NRHP-listed
Hill Mansion, Culpeper, Virginia, NRHP-listed
Slaughter–Hill House, Culpeper, Virginia, NRHP-listed (see also Slaughter-Hill Ranch in New Mexico) 
Samuel Hill House, Seattle, Washington, listed on the NRHP in King County, Washington

See also
The Haunting of Hill House (novel), a novel by Shirley Jackson
The Haunting of Hill House (TV series)
Hill House School (disambiguation)